Ikebukuro Station is a major railway station located in the Ikebukuro district of Toshima, Tokyo, Japan, shared by the East Japan Railway Company (JR East), Tokyo subway operator Tokyo Metro, and the two private railway operators Seibu Railway and Tobu Railway. With 2.71 million passengers on an average daily in 2007, it is the second-busiest railway station in the world (after Shinjuku Station), and the busiest station in the Tobu, Seibu, and Tokyo Metro networks. It primarily serves commuters from Saitama Prefecture and other residential areas northwest of the city center. It is the Tokyo terminal of the Seibu Ikebukuro Line and the Tobu Tojo Line.

Lines

JR East

Seibu Railway
 Seibu Ikebukuro Line (Ikebukuro to Agano) - limited through service to Seibu Chichibu Line

Tobu Railway
 Tōbu Tōjō Line (Ikebukuro to Yorii)

Tokyo Metro

Station layout
In Ikebukuro Station, there are two main entrances; the East exit and the West exit. There are a number of other secondary entrances such as the JR North exit, the various Seibu exits, and multiple subway exits.

The JR lines run north/south through the center. The Tobu platforms are to the northwest and the Seibu platforms are to the southeast. Both Tobu and Seibu operate department stores adjacent to their terminal stations. (Despite their names, "Seibu" (西武) starts with the kanji for "west" (西), but its platforms are in the eastern part of the station, while "Tōbu" (東武) starts with the character for "east" (東), but its platforms are in the western part of the station.)

The Marunouchi Line and Yurakucho Line run east/west two stories underground, while the Tokyo Metro Fukutoshin Line is four stories underground to the west of the main station complex. The latter line runs south toward Shinjuku and Shibuya along Meiji-dori, and offers through services to Motomachi-Chūkagai Station in Yokohama via the Tokyu Toyoko Line and Minatomirai Line.

Tokyo Metro's Echika underground mall is also located inside the station.

JR East

Chest-high platform edge doors were introduced on the Yamanote Line platforms on 2 March 2013.

Tobu Railway

Platforms

The Tobu station has three terminating tracks served by platforms 1 to 5, arranged as shown in the diagram on the right.

Platforms 3 and 5 are normally used for disembarking passengers, although platform 5 is also used for passengers boarding the evening TJ Liner services, which require payment of a supplementary fare. From 14 June 2015, the departure melodies used when trains are about to depart from the station are to be changed to classical themes, with "Allegro" from "Divertimento in D major, K. 136" by Mozart used for platforms 1/2, "Menuetto" from "Eine kleine Nachtmusik" by Mozart used for platforms 3/4, and "Allegro ma non troppo" from the "Pastoral Symphony" by Beethoven used for TJ Liner services departing from platform 5.

Chest-high platform edge doors are scheduled to be added by the end of fiscal 2020. Platform doors protecting platform 1 are in use since 21 April 2018. It is planned to have platform doors protecting platforms 2 and 3 in operation from 2 March 2019.

Ticket barriers
There are three sets of ticket barriers giving access to the platforms: the "South Gate" at ground level (signposted in red), and the "Central Gate" (signposted in blue) and "North Gate" (signposted in green) on the first basement level.

Seibu Railway

Platforms 1, 4, and 6 are normally used for disembarking passengers only.

Tokyo Metro

Platform

This station consists of three separate island platforms for the Marunouchi Line, Yurakucho Line, and Fukutoshin Line.

Station layout

The Tokyo Metro platforms are equipped with chest-height platform edge doors.

History

The station was opened on April 1, 1903 by the Japanese Government Railways (JGR). As the Tokyo terminus of the line was originally planned to be at Shimo-Itabashi, Ikebukuro Station is to this day marked by km post "-1.9" (the distance from Shimo-Itabashi Station where the "0 km" post for the line is located).

Tobu opened a department store adjoining its station on 29 May 1962. Around the same time, the Tobu station platforms were expanded with three tracks.

In March 1992, automatic ticket barriers were installed at the north exit of the Tobu Station, and in June of the same year, the Tobu Department Store was expanded with the addition of the Metropolitan Plaza annex located on the south side.

The station facilities of the Marunouchi and Yurakucho Lines were inherited by Tokyo Metro after the privatization of the Teito Rapid Transit Authority (TRTA) in 2004.

In June 2008, the Tobu station ticket barriers were colour-coded into three "zones": North, Central, and South.

Chest-height platform edge doors were installed on the Tokyo Metro Yurakucho Line platforms in January 2011.

Station numbering was introduced to the JR platforms in 2016 with Ikebukuro being assigned station numbers JY13 for the Yamanote line, JA12 for the Saikyo line, and JS21 for the Shonan-Shinjuku line.

Passenger statistics
The figures below are the official number of passengers entering and exiting each day released by each train operator.

Annual passenger figures for the station between fiscal 1903 and 1965 are as shown below. Note that the figures only consider boarding passengers and a blank indicates that no data is available.

The daily passenger figures for the JR East, Seibu, Tobu, and Tokyo Metro station after fiscal 2000 are as shown below. Note that the JR East figures only consider boarding passengers whereas the Seibu, Tobu, and Tokyo Metro figures consider both entering and exiting passengers.

Surrounding area

The surrounding Ikebukuro district is a major commercial centre. The Seibu department store, Sunshine City, Parco, and Bic Camera are located to the east of the station, while the Tobu department store and Metropolitan Plaza are located to the west.

Schools
 Rikkyo University
 Tokyo College of Music
 Teikyo Heisei University (Ikebukuro Campus)
 Tokyo University of Social Welfare (Ikebukuro Campus)
 Shukutoku University (Ikebukuro Satellite Campus)
 Tokyo College of Transport Studies
 Toshimagaoka-joshigakuen Junior and Senior High School

Retail
 Seibu Department Store
 Parco Department Store
 Tobu Department Store
 Sunshine City

Hotels
 Hotel Metropolitan
 Centurion hotel Ikebukuro

Civic
 Toshima Tax Office
 Toshima Civic Centre
 Tokyo Metropolitan Theatre
 Ikebukuro Library
 Ikebukuro Fire Station

Other stations
 Higashi-Ikebukuro Station, on the  Tokyo Metro Yurakucho Line

See also 
 List of East Japan Railway Company stations
 List of railway stations in Japan
 Transportation in Greater Tokyo

References

External links 

 JR Ikebukuro Station map 
 Ikebukuro Station information (Seibu) 
 Ikebukuro Station information (Tobu) 
 Ikebukuro Station information (Tokyo Metro) 

Yamanote Line
Saikyō Line
Shōnan-Shinjuku Line
Akabane Line
Seibu Ikebukuro Line
Tobu Tojo Main Line
Tokyo Metro Marunouchi Line
Tokyo Metro Yurakucho Line
Tokyo Metro Fukutoshin Line
Stations of East Japan Railway Company
Stations of Seibu Railway
Stations of Tobu Railway
Stations of Tokyo Metro
Railway stations in Tokyo
Railway stations in Japan opened in 1903
Ikebukuro
Buildings and structures in Toshima